Events from the year 1935 in Scotland.

Incumbents 

 Secretary of State for Scotland and Keeper of the Great Seal – Sir Godfrey Collins

Law officers 
 Lord Advocate – Wilfrid Normand until April; then Douglas Jamieson until December; then Thomas Mackay Cooper
 Solicitor General for Scotland – Douglas Jamieson until April; vacant until May; then Thomas Mackay Cooper until December; then Albert Russell

Judiciary 
 Lord President of the Court of Session and Lord Justice General – Lord Clyde until 1 April; then Lord Normand
 Lord Justice Clerk – Lord Aitchison
 Chairman of the Scottish Land Court – Lord MacGregor Mitchell

Events 
 31 March & 5 December – Glasgow Subway electrified service opened to public on inner and outer circle respectively
 16 May – Thomas Mackay Cooper becomes Solicitor General for Scotland, replacing Douglas Jamieson
 22 June – Kerr's Miniature Railway at Arbroath opens for business
 9 September – Glaswegian flyweight Benny Lynch becomes the first Scottish boxing world champion in a bout in Manchester
 mid–late September – Lancaster general practitioner Buck Ruxton disposes of the bodies of his murder victims near Moffat
 23 October – a footbridge across the River Forth at Cambuskenneth replaces a ferry
 2 November – Scottish-born thriller-writer John Buchan, 1st Baron Tweedsmuir, is sworn in as Governor General of Canada
 14 November – UK General Election: The Communist Party of Great Britain candidate, Willie Gallacher, wins the constituency of West Fife
 2 December – Albert Russell becomes Solicitor General for Scotland, replacing Thomas Mackay Cooper
 Edwin Muir publishes Scottish Journey

Births 
 5 February – Alex Harvey, glam rock musician (died 1982 in Belgium)
 21 February – Mark McManus, film and television actor (died 1994)
 2 March – Jackie Brown, boxer (died 2020)
 4 March – Nancy Whiskey, born Anne Wilson, folk singer (died 2003 in England)
 12 April – Keith Moffatt, applied mathematician specialising in magnetohydrodynamics
 5 May – Eddie Linden, poet and political activist
 8 May – Lucius Cary, 15th Viscount Falkland, politician
 9 May – Zander Wedderburn, psychologist (died 2017)
 7 June – William Stewart, biologist and academic
 16 July – Douglas Henderson, SNP politician and Member of Parliament 1974–79 (died 2006)
 10 August – John MacLeod of MacLeod, born John Wolrige-Gordon, clan chief (died 2007 in England)
 27 August – Eddie Connachan, goalkeeper (died 2021 in South Africa)
 12 September – David Macmillan, actor
 15 October – Richard McTaggart, boxer
 23 October – Ewan Hooper, actor
 22 November – Hugh C. Rae, novelist (died 2014)
 3 December – Robin Neillands writer specialising in travel and military history (died 2006)
 26 December – Stevie Chalmers, footballer (died 2019)
 31 December – Jeff Torrington, novelist (died 2008)
 Jack Alexander of The Alexander Brothers, folk singer (died 2013)
 Donald Forbes, criminal, "Scotland's most dangerous man" (died 2008)
 Hamish MacDonald, impressionist and colourist painter (died 2008)

Deaths 
 12 March – Malcolm Smith, Liberal Party politician and MP (born 1856)
 16 March – John James Rickard Macleod, recipient of the Nobel Prize in Physiology or Medicine (born 1876)
 28 April – Sir Alexander Mackenzie, composer (born 1847)
 5 June – James Manson, mechanical engineer (born 1845)
 22 June – George Brisbane Scott Douglas, poet and writer (born 1856 in Gibraltar)
 27 September – William W. Naismith, mountaineer (born 1856)
 11 October – Samuel Peploe, painter (born 1871)
 16 October – Margaret Moyes Black, novelist and biographer (born 1853)
 22 November – Noel Skelton, Unionist politician, journalist and intellectual (born 1880)

See also 
 Timeline of Scottish history
 1935 in Northern Ireland

References 

 
Years of the 20th century in Scotland
Scotland
1930s in Scotland